The third season of Mestre do Sabor premiered on Thursday, May 6, 2021, at  (BRT / AMT) on TV Globo.

Teams
Key
 Winner
 Runner-up
 Eliminated

Blind tests
 Key

Pressure tests

The Duels
 Key

Wildcard
 Key

Elimination chart
Key

Week 1: Quarterfinals

Week 2: Semifinals

Week 3: Finals

Ratings and reception

Brazilian ratings
All numbers are in points and provided by Kantar Ibope Media.

References

External links
 Mestre do Sabor on Gshow.com

2021 Brazilian television seasons